Yann Randrianasolo (born 3 February 1994) is a French athlete specialising in the long jump. He won a silver medal at the 2019 Summer Universiade. A year earlier he won a bronze at the 2018 Mediterranean Games.

He competed collegiately at the University of South Carolina, where he was a first-team All-American as a senior in 2019.

His personal bests in the event are 8.08 metres outdoors (+1.4 m/s, Austin 2019) and 7.94 metres indoors (Columbia 2019).

International competitions

1Representing Réunion

References

1994 births
Living people
French male long jumpers
French expatriate sportspeople in the United States
South Carolina Gamecocks men's track and field athletes
Mediterranean Games medalists in athletics
Universiade silver medalists for France
Universiade medalists in athletics (track and field)
Medalists at the 2019 Summer Universiade
Mediterranean Games bronze medalists for France
Athletes (track and field) at the 2018 Mediterranean Games
21st-century French people
20th-century French people